David Gilbert-Smith, MC (3 December 1931 – 24 March 2003) was a Scotland international rugby union footballer and a British Army officer. Gilbert-Smith played as a flanker.

Rugby union career

Amateur career
Gilbert-Smith played for London Scottish. He also played for the Army Rugby Union side.

International career
Gilbert-Smith was capped for  once, in 1952, in the Five Nations Calcutta Cup match against .

Army career
Gilbert-Smith joined the British Army in 1951. He won the Military Cross as a result of his bravery when with the Duke of Wellington's Regiment in the Battle of the Hook in Korea in 1953. He fought in the battle alongside another Scotland international rugby player, Mike Campbell-Lamerton. The two became lifelong friends.

Gilbert-Smith also served in the Special Air Service (SAS).

Business career
Gilbert-Smith subsequently worked as a Training Manager for Bulmers. He later founded the Leadership Trust in 1975, working with Janet Richardson, a behavioural psychologist, whom he married in 1985.

References

External links
Liddell Hart Military Archives, King's College London
Army international caps
Leadership Trust

1931 births
Scottish rugby union players
Scotland international rugby union players
Rugby union flankers
2003 deaths
Sportspeople from Pune
Army rugby union players
London Scottish F.C. players
Duke of Wellington's Regiment officers
British Army personnel of the Korean War
Recipients of the Military Cross
Special Air Service officers
People educated at St Edward's School, Oxford
Rugby players from Maharashtra